Prelog may refer to: 

Prelog, Slovenia, a settlement in the Municipality of Domžale in Slovenia
Prelog, Croatia, a town in Međimurje County in northern Croatia
Prelog (surname)
Prelog strain, an interaction in organic chemistry

de:Prelog
el:Πρελόγκ
eo:Prelog
hr:Prelog
it:Prelog
hu:Perlak
nl:Prelog
pl:Prelog
ro:Prelog
sr:Прелог
sh:Prelog